The Digswell Dog Show is an Australian animated series produced by Energee Entertainment in 1998. The show featured a girl named Daisy and her dog that's named Digswell. He is named Digswell because he is very good at digging. Each episode had 2 shorts in one episode that ran for 24 minutes.

Characters

Main
 Digswell (voiced by Dave Gibson) - Digswell is a dog who is a really good digger. He digs so fast that can dig all the way to any part of the world in a few seconds. 
 Daisy (voiced by Rachel King) - Daisy is a little girl with blonde hair and wears a magenta shirt and blue jeans. She is the owner of Digswell and always goes out on adventures with him.

Other
 Mum & Dad
 Red Haired News Reporter
 Millicent
 Eatswell
 Singswell

Episodes

See also 
 List of Australian television series

References

Australian children's animated television series
Network 10 original programming
1998 Australian television series debuts
1999 Australian television series endings
1990s Australian animated television series
Animated television series about children
Animated television series about dogs
Television shows set in Sydney